The 1985 Wuqia earthquake occurred on August 23, 1985, at 20:42 local time (12:42 UTC) near the border of Wuqia County and Shufu County, Xinjiang, China. It had a magnitude of  7.4 and caused 71 deaths, 162 injuries, and left 15,000 homeless, as well as destroying 85% of buildings and highways. The source of this earthquake is the Kazkeaerte Fault (卡兹克阿尔特断裂). The earthquake could be felt throughout much of the Fergana Basin, USSR, as well as in Pakistan.

The zone is made up of smaller faults, fissures, and pressure ridges.

References

External links

1985 earthquakes
1985 disasters in China
1985 in the Soviet Union
1985 Wuqia
August 1985 events in Asia